Fox Sports 1 (FS1) is an American pay television channel owned by the Fox Sports Media Group, a unit of Fox Corporation. FS1 replaced the motorsports network Speed on August 17, 2013, at the same time that its companion channel Fox Sports 2 replaced Fuel TV. Both FS1 and FS2 carried over most of the sports programming from their predecessors, as well as content from Fox Soccer, which would then be replaced by the entertainment-based channel FXX on September 2, 2013.

FS1 airs an array of live sporting events, including Major League Baseball, college sports (most notably Big Ten, Pac-12 and Big 12 football, and Big East basketball), soccer matches (including Major League Soccer, Liga MX, Copa Libertadores, and FIFA World Cup), and a variety of motorsports events. FS1 also features daily sports news, analysis and discussion programming as well as sports-related reality and documentary programs.

The network is based primarily from the Fox Sports division's headquarters on the Fox Studio Lot in the Century City section of Los Angeles, California, though the network also has significant broadcast operations in New York City and Charlotte, North Carolina (the latter of which had served as Speed's home base).

As of September 2018, Fox Sports 1 is available to approximately 83.3 million pay television households (90.3% of households with cable) in the United States.

Background

Development
In March 2012, reports began circulating that Fox Entertainment Group had plans to launch a national Fox Sports cable network by August 2013 known as Fox Sports 1, giving the sports division a dedicated cable presence to better compete against established networks like ESPN. Fox was already a major force in cable sports programming, having operated several niche channels such as Fox Soccer, Fox Deportes, Fuel TV and Fox College Sports. Also in its portfolio were the Fox Sports Networks, a group of regional sports networks both owned by Fox outright or by other companies through affiliation agreements with FSN; in addition to carrying play-by-play rights to several local sports teams, these regional networks also featured common national content produced and distributed by Fox Sports, including national college sports broadcasts and specialty programs such as The Best Damn Sports Show Period and Baseball's Golden Age.

Though this local/national hybrid approach gave Fox prominence at the local sports level, it was somewhat disadvantaged as its flagship over-the-air network had the distinction of being the only major U.S. broadcast television network not to have a national general sports channel to complement its sports division, unlike ABC (whose corporate parent The Walt Disney Company owns a controlling 80% stake in ESPN), CBS (which operates CBS Sports Network) and NBC (which had run NBCSN).

The reports indicated that Fox planned on converting one of these niche sports channels, Speed – which focused on auto racing and other motorsports, as well as motorsports-related specialty programs, into the new Fox Sports 1 due to its established reach on U.S. pay television providers (Speed maintained a subscriber base of 81 million homes with cable, IPTV or satellite service by 2012), which would result in the reduction of the channel's commitment to NASCAR and other motorsports coverage.

Further supporting this theory, reports surfaced in January 2013 that Fox Soccer would be relaunched as FXX, a general entertainment network that would be spun off from FX and would feature comedy series and feature films; such reports were confirmed when the channel's planned launch was officially announced by Fox Entertainment Group on March 28, 2013. In October 2012, Speed altered its on-air logo bug to include the Fox Sports logo above its own, which was believed to indicate a step towards this replacement. Fox Sports would officially confirm the conversion of Speed into Fox Sports 1 in an announcement on March 5, 2013.

Despite being established well after ESPN (which launched in 1979), and the NBC- and CBS-owned sports networks (which respectively launched in 1996 and 2003 under different ownership and branding), Fox Sports 1, even before commencing programming, has been seen as a legitimate and serious competitor to ESPN, in part due to three factors:
 Audience reach – By taking over Speed's transponder space, Fox Sports 1 was expected to reach 90 million households at the time of its launch (with most cable and satellite providers carrying it on the channel slot, almost entirely through distribution on basic cable tiers, that Speed had occupied on their channel lineups). While that number is relatively less than ESPN's total reach at that time (99 million homes), it is also more than the 77.9 million homes that NBCSN reached at the beginning of 2013, which was hamstrung by some of its reach being only through carriage on digital cable tiers.
 Brand awareness – Fox heavily promoted Fox Sports 1's launch through its various television, online and social media platforms, including appearances of Fox Sports 1 talent on existing Fox programming and the online posting of its shows' pre-launch rehearsals.
 Programming strategy – Fox was aggressive in seeking and securing major content for FS1, employing a strategy to obtain rights to popular sports and leagues that they believed other networks underserved, as well as creating high-profile original shows (see Programming below).

Fox Sports executives see Fox Sports 1 as "an alternative to the establishment", much as the Fox Broadcasting Company was to other broadcast networks in the 1980s and Fox News Channel was to CNN in the 1990s. In terms of growth, Fox Entertainment Group acknowledged that Fox Sports 1 would start modestly and not be competitively equal with ESPN right out of the gate; however, the company foresees the network growing incrementally, believing that the channel will be on-par with its senior competitor within a few years of its launch. Viewership figures for the end of 2019, however, showed FS1 over 1.4 million viewers behind ESPN and even trailing NBCSN by 17,000.

Launch and carriage

Fox Sports 1 formally launched on August 17, 2013, at 6:00 a.m. Eastern Time, with the following introduction:

The launch day featured 16½ hours of live sports coverage, including NASCAR coverage during the late morning and afternoon (highlighted by a Camping World Truck Series qualifying round and race), five hours of UFC bouts in the evening (the main event of the Fight Night card being a match between Maurício Rua and Chael Sonnen), and the premiere of the sports news and discussion show Fox Sports Live following the conclusion of the UFC event.

Although marketed as a relaunch of Speed, Fox Sports 1 was contractually considered to be a new channel; due to its change in scope from automotive and motorsports to mainstream sports, Fox was required to reach new deals with providers for them to carry the network. At first, Fox sought a higher carriage fee as well, estimated at 80¢ per subscriber (more than triple the subscriber fee of 23¢ that Speed had commanded; by comparison, ESPN pulls in fees of approximately $5.00 per subscriber, the most expensive fee of any pay television network). Concerns by providers over the increasing costs for cable and satellite services for their customers (largely believed to be partly due to the higher fees commanded by certain sports channels) resulted in Fox backing off charging the 80¢ per subscriber rate, instead charging the same 23¢ rate that those providers paid to carry Speed. For any remaining providers that had not reached a deal to carry Fox Sports 1, Fox planned to offer a version of Speed with limited programming on an interim basis until a deal was reached, in order to fulfill existing contracts that required Fox to provide a motorsports channel.

Carriage deals were made by the launch date with all major cable and satellite providers, including cable/telco providers Comcast, Charter Communications, Cox Communications, Verizon FiOS, AT&T U-verse, Cablevision, Bright House Networks, Mediacom, Suddenlink Communications, Cable One and Time Warner Cable, as well as satellite providers DirecTV and Dish Network. The deals with Time Warner, Dish and DirecTV – which were announced just days before FS1's launch – were seen as crucial to the network, as those three providers had a combined reach of over 40 million households, nearly half the goal of 90 million homes that FS1 set for its launch.

International markets that previously received the U.S. version of Speed (such as Canada, the Caribbean, and the U.S. territory of Puerto Rico) did not gain access to Fox Sports 1 upon its relaunch; in Canada, the Canadian Radio-television and Telecommunications Commission permitted the carriage of Speed as a foreign service, but Fox did not seek carriage of FS1 in that country (some of the sports event programming that Fox Sports 1 holds the broadcast rights to carry already air in that country on domestic sports networks such as TSN and Sportsnet). A version of Speed remains operational for these markets (now known as Fox Sports Racing), airing a lineup of past Speed reality shows, and coverage of NASCAR and other motorsports events simulcast with Fox Sports 1 or Fox Sports 2. In early 2014, some major Canadian service providers began to drop the channel upon the expiration of their contractual rights to carry Speed.

Post-launch 
In 2015, Fox Sports 1 added coverage of selected NASCAR Sprint Cup Series events, USGA championship events, FIFA tournaments, and Major League Soccer. In July of that year (coinciding with the 2015 FIFA Women's World Cup), the network began to phase out use of the full "Fox Sports 1" name and logo from on-air and promotional usage, identifying the network as simply "FS1" with a new wordmark logo. A representative for Fox Sports stated that was intended to streamline the channel's marketing, and reflect common usage.

On July 14, 2015, Fox Sports reached a long-term agreement with the National Hot Rod Association (NHRA) to broadcast its drag racing events beginning in 2016. Fox's package includes coverage of Friday and Saturday qualifying, and Sunday elimination races for NHRA Mello Yello Drag Racing Series events (with a minimum of 16 elimination races presented live, and the remainder shown either on weekend afternoons or in primetime; four of the live elimination races will be aired by the main Fox network, with the rest, as well as encores, on FS1 and FS2), and coverage of select NHRA Lucas Oil Drag Racing Sportsman Series events on FS1. The contract succeeded one with ESPN.

On March 21, 2018, Fox Sports announced that it had acquired the television rights for the PBA Tour of ten-pin bowling, beginning in 2019 (once again replacing ESPN). 26 broadcasts in the 2019 season are scheduled to air on FS1, with four additional broadcasts to air on the main Fox network.

Programming

Event coverage
Sports programming on FS1 includes the following:
Baseball
 Major League Baseball (2014–present)
 40 regular season MLB games (mostly on Saturdays)
 Up to 15 post-season games (eight Divisional Series games and one best-of-seven League Championship Series)
World Baseball Classic (2023-present)

Basketball
 Jr. NBA World Championship (2018–present)

Boxing
 Premier Boxing Champions (2015–present)

Bowling 
 PBA Tour (2019–present) 

College
 NCAA football and basketball (2013–present)
 Big East men's and women's basketball (2013–present)
 Big 12 football and women's basketball (2013–present)
 Pac-12 football and men's and women's basketball (2013–present)
 Big Ten football and men's basketball (2017–present)
 Mountain West football and men's basketball (2020–present)
 Holiday Bowl (2017–present)

Dog shows
 Westminster (2017–present)

Futsal
 FIFA Futsal World Cup (exclusive coverage of the 2016, 2020 and 2024 FIFA Futsal World Cup)

Horse racing
 Up to 10 graded stakes races (2014–present)
 Two top stakes races (2014–present)

Motorsports
 ARCA Menards Series (2013–present)
 NASCAR (2013–present)
 NASCAR Cup Series (2013–present)
 NASCAR Xfinity Series (2015–present)
 NASCAR Camping World Truck Series (2013–present)
 National Hot Rod Association (2016–present)
 NHRA Mello Yello Drag Racing Series; coverage of Friday and Saturday qualifying, and Sunday eliminations
 NHRA Lucas Oil Drag Racing Series; Select Sportsman eliminations
 NHRA J&A Service Pro Mod Drag Racing Series

Professional wrestling
 WWE SmackDown (2019–present; replays from Fox – will air live on FS1 coast to coast if there is a conflict on Fox)

Rugby union
 Major League Rugby (2020–present)

Soccer
 CONCACAF (2013–present)
 CONCACAF Gold Cup (2014–present)
 CONCACAF Champions League (2020–present)
 CONCACAF Men's Olympic Qualifying Tournament (2020)
 FIFA World Cup (exclusive coverage of the 2018, 2022 and 2026 FIFA World Cup)
 FIFA Women's World Cup (exclusive coverage of the 2015, 2019 and 2023 FIFA Women's World Cup)
 FIFA U-20 World Cup
 FIFA U-20 Women's World Cup
 FIFA U-17 World Cup
 FIFA U-17 Women's World Cup
 Cope de France(2023-present)
Liga MX
 Tijuana home matches (2018–present)
 Monterrey home matches (2018–present)
 Santos home matches (2019–present)
 Major League Soccer (2015–present; 34 regular season matches)
MLS All-Star Game (2015–present; rights alternated with ESPN until 2022)
 U.S. Men's National Soccer Team (2015–present; rights to all matches shared with ESPN)
 U.S. Women's National Soccer Team (2015–present; rights to all matches shared with ESPN)

News and analysis programming
FS1 airs various studio shows mainly involving debating sports topics, especially in the afternoon and early evening. In May 2015, Fox Sports hired Jamie Horowitz, formerly of ESPN, to oversee the channel as Fox Sports' President of National Networks. Following his arrival, FS1 began to pivot its studio programming towards opinion-oriented panel shows similar to those he oversaw on ESPN, and also hired away several notable personalities from ESPN, such as Skip Bayless and Colin Cowherd (who were featured on new programs such as Speak for Yourself and Skip and Shannon: Undisputed). Horowitz likened this strategy, which has been referred to as "embrace debate", to that of sister property Fox News Channel; he argued that fewer viewers were watching conventional sports news programs such as SportsCenter due to the ubiquity of online news and highlights, but that there were "record highs" for opinion programs.

After Horowitz's exit from Fox, his replacement Mark Silverman (who came from Big Ten Network) admitted that FS1 had matured and "grown past 'embrace debate'", emphasizing a focus on offering shows that are "smart, entertaining and interesting to sports fans", alongside opinion-based programs.

In September 2018, FS1 premiered a sports betting-related studio program, Lock It In, which featured Clay Travis as well as Vegas bookie Todd Fuhrman, former Jimmy Kimmel Live! sidekick "Cousin Sal" Iacono, and Rachel Bonnetta.  The show was renamed Fox Bet Live, to tie it in with the Fox Sports gambling app of the same name.  The program would be canceled in 2022.

Daily
The Carton Show (weekdays 7–9:30 a.m. Eastern) – Morning talk/interview program hosted by Craig Carton
Skip and Shannon: Undisputed (weekdays 9:30 a.m.–noon Eastern) – Debate program with Skip Bayless, Shannon Sharpe, and Jen Hale
The Herd with Colin Cowherd (weekdays noon–3 p.m. Eastern) – Simulcast of Colin Cowherd's radio program on Fox Sports Radio.
First Things First (weekdays 3–4:30 p.m. Eastern) - Panel discussion program with Chris Broussard, Nick Wright, and Kevin Wildes
Speak! (weekdays 4:30–6 p.m. Eastern; replayed late nights) Panel discussion program with Joy Taylor, LeSean McCoy and Emmanuel Acho
TMZ Sports (late nights) - Spinoff of the syndicated TMZ celebrity gossip show, but focused specifically on athletes.

Seasonal
Big Noon Kickoff (Saturday mornings) − Simulcast of the college football pregame show on Fox
NASCAR RaceDay (Saturday afternoon or Sunday morning depending on the race time) – A pre-race show for the NASCAR Cup Series, hosted by Shannon Spake or Adam Alexander with Bobby Labonte and Jamie McMurray providing analysis; the program was carried over to the network from Speed.
NASCAR Race Hub (weekdays 6–7 p.m. Eastern) – A daily program featuring news and analysis on the NASCAR circuit, including reviews of previous races and previews of upcoming action; the program was carried over to the network from Speed.

Former
Daily/Weekly
America's Pregame (weeknights 5:00–6:00 p.m. Eastern; April 7, 2014 – October 2, 2015) – An early evening preview of the night's sports action; the program was cancelled on September 30, 2015, due to low ratings.
Crowd Goes Wild (August 17, 2013 - May 8, 2014) - Daily talk show hosted by Regis Philbin and featuring Katie Nolan.
Fox NFL Kickoff (Sundays 11:00 a.m.–12:00 p.m. Eastern during the NFL season; August 18, 2013 – January 18, 2015) – A program previewing the day's NFL action, it serves as the supplementary program to the Fox Broadcasting Company's existing pre-game show Fox NFL Sunday. Fox NFL Kickoff moved to Fox on September 13, 2015, in an effort to boost the program's low viewership and to serve as a lead-in for Fox NFL Sunday.
Fox Sports Live with Jay and Dan (nightly 11:00 p.m.–11:30 p.m. Eastern; August 17, 2013 – February 22, 2017) – Fox Sports 1's flagship sports news program, which aired directly opposite ESPN's SportsCenter on most nights. The program was primarily anchored by Jay Onrait and Dan O'Toole, who came to FS1 from the Canadian sports channel TSN, where the pair gained popularity for their irreverent and humorous presentation of sports news while serving as anchors of the late-night editions of that network's SportsCentre. The show's first run featured analysis and opinions on that night's events and that day's sports news, with Jay and Dan discussing the day's major stories from FS1's sister channels (such as Big Ten Network). In February 2016, the show was rebranded as a late night talk show in order to appeal to a younger generation and to boost low ratings. The program was cancelled on February 23, 2017.
The Mike Francesa Show (2014–2015) − WFAN radio host Mike Francesa agreed to simulcast a portion of his show on Fox Sports 1 and Fox Sports 2. However, the arrangement ended after only one year, on September 11, 2015. Francesa took full blame for the partnership not succeeding.
Garbage Time with Katie Nolan - Fox Sports 1's weekly program was aired from March 15, 2015, to February 2017; de facto cancelled upon Nolan's move to ESPN.
UFC Tonight (Wednesdays 7 p.m. Eastern) – Hosted by Kenny Florian and Karyn Bryant, the program features the latest news, highlights, and analysis from the UFC; this program was carried over to FS1 from Fuel TV (now Fox Sports 2). This program ended in December 2018 due to UFC signing a deal with ESPN starting in 2019.
Fair Game with Kristine Leahy (weekdays 5:30 p.m. Eastern; October 2018 – December 2019) - Fox Sports 1's daily half-hour interview program was aired from October 2018 to December 2019.

Live events
Football
 XFL (2020)

Golf
 USGA Championships (2015–2020)
 U.S. Open (2015–2019; live coverage of the first two rounds)
 U.S. Senior Open (2015–2019; live coverage of the first two rounds)
 U.S. Women's Open (2015–2019; live coverage of the first two rounds)
 U.S. Senior Women's Open (2018–2019)
 U.S. Men's, Women's and Junior Amateur Championships (2015–2020)
 U.S. Men's and Women's Four-Ball Championships (2015–2020)
 Curtis Cup (2018)

Motorsports
 Formula E (2014–2020)

Soccer
 German Bundesliga (2015–2020)
DFL-Supercup (2015–2020)
 Bundesliga relegation playoffs (2015–2020)

Ratings
Its live events (such as NASCAR races) are beaten in the ratings by ESPN, and the program Undisputed is behind 613,000 viewers to Pardon the Interruption. Live events have still provided FS1 with high ratings.

Season averages 

The following table shows average season viewership for certain team sports competitions on FS1:

Individual events

Major League Baseball 
 2014 National League Championship Series
 Game 2: 4.4 million viewers
 Game 4: 5.1 million viewers
 Game 5: 4.9 million viewers
 2015 American League Championship Series
 Game 1: 5.9 million viewers
 Game 6: 5.6 million viewers
 2016 National League Championship Series
 Game 2: 7.3 million viewers
 Game 6: 9.7 million viewers
 2017 American League Championship Series
 Game 1: 6.2 million viewers
 Game 3: 3.1 (5.1 million viewers)
 Game 4: 4.7 million viewers
 Game 5: 3.3 (5.3 million viewers)
 Game 6: 8.2 million viewers
 Game 7: 9.9 million viewers
 2018 National League Division Series
 Milwaukee Brewers vs. Colorado Rockies
 Game 1: 2.46 million viewers
 Game 2: 1.77 million viewers
 Los Angeles Dodgers vs. Atlanta Braves
 Game 2: 2.03 million viewers
 Game 3: 3.02 million viewers
 Game 4: 2.17 million viewers
 2018 National League Championship Series
 Game 1: 4.64 million viewers
 Game 3: 4.21 million viewers
 Game 4: 4.21 million viewers
 2019 American League Division Series
 New York Yankees vs Minnesota Twins
 Game 2: 2.32 million viewers
 Game 3: 2.66 million viewers
 Houston Astros vs Tampa Bay Rays
 Game 1: 2.53 million viewers
 Game 2: 1.39 million viewers
 Game 4: 3.70 million viewers
 Game 5: 3.67 million viewers
 2019 American League Championship Series
 Houston Astros vs New York Yankees
 Game 2: 5.59 million viewers
 Game 3: 3.84 million viewers
 Game 4: 5.86 million viewers
 Game 5: 5.63 million viewers
 Game 6: 7.47 million viewers
 2020 National League Division Series
 Los Angeles Dodgers vs San Diego Padres
 Game 1: 1.49 million viewers
 Game 2: 1.64 million viewers
 Atlanta Braves vs Miami Marlins
 Game 1: 1.30 million viewers
 Game 3: 1.01 million viewers
 2020 National League Championship Series
 Los Angeles Dodgers vs Atlanta Braves
 Game 2: 2.46 million viewers
 Game 3: 2.09 million viewers 
 Game 4: 5.04 million viewers (also aired on Fox) 
 Game 5: 3.61 million viewers
 Game 6: 4.28 million viewers
 Game 7: 9.67 million viewers (also aired on Fox)
 2021 American League Division Series
 Tampa Bay Rays vs Boston Red Sox 
 Game 1: 2.70 million viewers
 Game 2: 2.70 million viewers
 Game 4: 3.47 million viewers
 Houston Astros vs Chicago White Sox
 Game 1: 2.06 million viewers
 Game 4: 1.70 million viewers
 2021 American League Championship Series
 Houston Astros vs Boston Red Sox
 Game 2: 778 thousand viewers (5.7 million viewers with Fox viewership added))
 Game 3: 3.5 million viewers
 Game 4: 4.1 million viewers
 Game 5: 3.5 million viewers
 Game 6: 5.8 million viewers
2022 National League Division Series
San Diego Padres vs Los Angeles Dodgers
Game 1: 2.4 million viewers
Game 2: 3.1 million viewers 
Game 3: 4.1 million viewers 
Game 4: 3.0 million viewers 
Atlanta Braves vs Philadelphia Phillies
Game 3: 2.9 million viewers
Game 4: 2.8 million viewers
2022 National League Championship Series
San Diego Padres vs Philadelphia Phillies
Game 1: 4.1 million viewers

College football

Regular season

Other Notable Games  
 2013 Texas Tech - Texas: 1.0
 2013 Oklahoma - Kansas State: 1.07
 2013 Washington State - Oregon: 1.1
 2013 Oregon - Washington: 1.77
 2014 Washington - Oregon: 1.13 
 2014 Oklahoma State - TCU: 1.0
 2014 Baylor - West Virginia: 1.64
 2014 Oregon - Cal: 1.2
 2014 West Virginia - Texas: 1.32
 2014 Baylor - Oklahoma: 2.05
 2014 TCU - Texas: 1.3 
 2014 Oklahoma - Oklahoma State: 1.1
 2015 West Virginia - Oklahoma: 1.238  
 2015 Baylor - Kansas State: 1.189 
 2015 Texas Tech - Texas: 1.358  
 2016 Kansas State - Stamford: 1.358 
 2016 USC - Utah: 1.0 
 2016 Washington - Utah: 1.376
 2016 Texas - Texas Tech: 1.051  
 2016 West Virginia - Texas: 1.269 
 2016 Baylor - West Virginia: 1.0
 2017 Washington - Colorado: 1.049  
 2017 Oklahoma - Baylor: 1.254
 2017 Nebraska vs Illinois: 1.0 
 2017 Kansas State - Texas: 1.266
 2017 West Virginia - TCU: 1.149 
 2017 Washington - Stamford: 1.057 
 2017 Nebraska - Penn State: 1.564 
 2017 Iowa State - Nebraska: 1.4
 2018 Texas - Maryland: 1.274 
 2018 Penn State vs Illinois: 1.170 
 2018 Nebraska - Michigan: 1.449 
 2018 Colorado - USC: 1.184
 2018 West Virginia - Iowa State: 1.323
 2018 Texas - Kansas: 1.185 
 2019 Iowa - Iowa State: 1.17
 2019 Utah - USC: 1.42
 2019 Nebraska - Minnesota: 1.02
 2019 Texas - Iowa State: 1.07
 2019 Texas - Baylor: 1.15
 2020 Michigan - Indiana: 1.75
 2020 Penn State - Nebraska: 1.72
 2020 Iowa - Minnesota: 1.42 
 2020 Wisconsin - Iowa: 1.80 
 2020 Minnesota - Nebraska: 1.05
 2021 Iowa - Maryland: 1.38
 2021 Nebraska - Michigan State: 1.66

Bowl Games

NASCAR Cup Series

Regular season

Other Notable Races
 2014 Duel: 1.9 (3.1 million viewers)
 2014 All-Star Race: 2.1 (3.5 million viewers)
 2015 Duel: 1.8 (3.0 million viewers)
 2015 Martinsville: 2.4 (4.1 million viewers)
 2015 All-Star Race: 2.1 (3.8 million viewers)
 2015 Dover: 2.5 (3.9 million viewers)
 2015 Pocono: 2.3 (3.6 million viewers)
 2015 Michigan: 2.2 (3.5 million viewers)
 2015 Sonoma: 2.3 (3.7 million viewers)
 2016 Duel: 1.6 (2.5 million viewers)
 2016 Martinsville: 2.2 (4.2 million viewers)
 2016 All-Star Race: 2.0 (3.3 million viewers)
 2016 Sonoma: 2.2 (3.9 million viewers)
 2017 Duel: 2.5 million viewers
 2017 Martinsville: 2.3 (4.0 million viewers)
 2017 All-Star Race: 1.6 (2.9 million viewers)
 2018 Pocono: 1.6 (2.7 million viewers)
 2018 Texas: 1.7 (2.8 million viewers)
 2018 Dover: 1.7 (2.8 million viewers) 
 2019 Martinsville: 1.5 (2.5 million viewers)
 2019 Sonoma: 1.5 (2.5 million viewers)
 2019 Bristol: 1.7 (2.8 million viewers) 
 2020 Bristol: 1.7 (2.9 million viewers)
 2020 Pocono: 1.6 (2.7 million viewers) 
 2020 Kentucky: 1.6 (2.6 million viewers)
 2021 All-Star Race: 1.6 (2.7 million viewers)
 2021 Sonoma: 1.5 (2.5 million viewers)
 2021 Darlington: 1.7 (3.1 million viewers)
 2021 Kansas: 1.6 (2.7 million viewers)

Ultimate Fighting Championship 
 UFC Fight Night 59 prelims: 1.1 million viewers
 UFC Fight Night 59: 2.8 million viewers
 UFC Fight Night 81 prelims: 1.8 million viewers
 UFC Fight Night 81: 2.3 million viewers
 UFC Fight Night 82 prelims: 1.1 million viewers
 UFC Fight Night 82: 1.3 million viewers
 UFC 168 prelims: 1.6 million viewers
 UFC 182 prelims: 1.0 million viewers
 UFC 193 prelims: 1.3 million viewers
 UFC 194 prelims: 1.9 million viewers
 UFC 195 prelims: 1.0 million viewers
 UFC 196 prelims: 1.8 million viewers
 UFC 207 prelims: 1.5 million viewers
 UFC 229 prelims: 1.3 million viewers

Soccer 
 2015 FIFA Women's World Cup - United States vs Australia: 3.9 million
 2015 FIFA Women's World Cup - Japan vs England: 2.3 million
 2015 FIFA Women's World Cup - United States vs Colombia: 4.7 million
 2016 Copa America Centenario quarterfinals: - United States vs Ecuador: 2.1 million
 2017 CONCACAF Gold Cup final - : United States vs Jamaica: 1.8 million
 2019 CONCACAF Gold Cup final - Mexico vs United States: 2.9 million
 2021 Copa América final - Argentina vs Brazil: 1.8 million
 2021 CONCACAF Gold Cup final - United States vs Mexico: 1.9 million

Carriage disputes
In February 2015, Fox Sports 1 became part of a carriage dispute with AT&T U-verse, as Fox Sports Media Group pursued higher carriage fees for the network to cover the cost of sports broadcast rights that had been acquired by the group to fill FS1's schedule since its launch. AT&T declined to accept these additional fees, with a representative for the provider stating that "while it's important to us that we provide our customers with the content they want, we don't believe that it is reasonable to pass on the added costs of carrying this programming to our customer." Rather than pull the channel outright, Fox instead began blacking out certain sporting events carried by FS1 on U-verse, including certain NASCAR, Major League Soccer, Major League Baseball and college basketball events.

References

External links

 

 
Fox Sports
English-language television stations in the United States
Sports television networks in the United States
Television channels and stations established in 2013
Television networks in the United States
2013 establishments in the United States